Hejiaqiao Town(), is an urban town in Liling City, Zhuzhou City, Hunan Province, People's Republic of China.

Cityscape
The town is divided into 9 villages and 2 communities, the following areas: Yunyan Community, Mingyue Community, Xintai Village, Qixing Village, Heshi Village, Huma Village, Miaoquan Village, Hongluo Village, Sichong Village, Shuikoushan Village, and Dangzaishan Village.

References

Historic township-level divisions of Liling